Eric Johnston (1896–1963) was an American business owner.

Eric Johnston may also refer to:
Eric Johnston (NT Administrator) (1933–1997), Royal Australian Navy officer and administrator of the Northern Territory
Eric Johnston (water polo) (1914–?), Australian water polo player
Eric Johnston (engineer), a software engineer who created Eric's Pixel Expansion (EPX) and developed Ben's Game

See also
Eric Johnstone (born 1943), footballer
Eric Johnson (disambiguation)
Eric St Johnston (1911–1986), Chief Inspector of Constabulary, UK